Sten Bergheden, born in 1965, is a Swedish politician of the Moderate Party. He has been a member of the Riksdag since 2006.

References

 Riksdagen: Sten Bergheden (m)

Living people
1965 births
Members of the Riksdag 2006–2010
Members of the Riksdag 2010–2014
Members of the Riksdag 2014–2018
Members of the Riksdag 2018–2022
Members of the Riksdag from the Moderate Party
Members of the Riksdag 2022–2026
21st-century Swedish politicians